Owen Thomas Phillips III (better known as Tripp Phillips) (born August 26, 1977) is a former American professional tennis player.

Early life

Phillips was born in Newport News, Virginia. He started to play tennis at the age of four with his mother Brenda and father O.T. When he was 16, he was among the top 10 in America in boy's 16-18. 

He attended Charlotte Country Day School and then the University of North Carolina at Chapel Hill, where he majored in sports science and was an All-American his senior year.

Phillips is married to Laura Zuger. He is currently an assistant coach for the UNC Tar Heels men's tennis team.

Tennis career
He has won two ATP doubles title in his career, the first was in Tokyo, Japan on October 2, 2006 when he and his partner, Ashley Fisher defeated American duo Paul Goldstein and Jim Thomas in straight sets, 6-2, 7-5. The second was at the 2008 Indianapolis Tennis Championships when he and Fisher defeated Scott Lipsky and David Martin, 6-3, 3-6, 10-5.

Also, he has won several ITF circuit challengers with Fisher and also in Atlantic City with his partner Ryan Sachire. In 2006 he partnered with Rogier Wassen to win the doubles title at  an ITF challenger event in Mexico City.

In 2004, he played his only singles match at the ATP World Tour level. It came at the Franklin Templeton Tennis Classic in Scottsdale, Arizona, and he lost to compatriot Robby Ginepri in the first round, 6-2, 6-0. 

In 2008, he paired with K. J. Hippensteel to win two matches in doubles qualifying and make the main draw at Wimbledon. They then lost in the first round of the main draw to Ross Hutchins and Stephen Huss, 6-3, 6-7(5), 7-5, 6-2.

ATP Tour career finals

Doubles: 2 (2 titles)

Mixed doubles

ATP Challenger and ITF Futures finals

Singles: 3 (1–2)

Doubles: 43 (28–15)

Grand Slam doubles performance timeline

Sources

External links
 
 

American male tennis players
North Carolina Tar Heels men's tennis players
People from Chapel Hill, North Carolina
Sportspeople from Newport News, Virginia
Tennis people from North Carolina
Tennis people from Virginia
1977 births
Living people
North Carolina Tar Heels men's tennis coaches
American tennis coaches